Christianity in Albania was established throughout the country in 325 AD. From 1100 AD, the Byzantine Empire carried out Church missions in the area. In relation to the increasing influence of Venice, the Franciscans started to settle down in the area in the 13th century. From the 15th century to the 19th century, under the rule of the Ottoman Empire, Christianity was replaced by Islam as the majority religion in Albania during the Ottoman Empire. The Albanian government, as per the disputed 2011 population census, gives the percentages of religious affiliations with only 58% Muslim, 10% Catholic, 7% Orthodox and 15% atheist or nonreligious since the fall of Communism in 1991, yet the 2011 census did not get most of the population due to poor counting of the population and the inability to reach most citizens. 
In the 2011 census the declared religious affiliation of the population was: 56.7% Muslims, 13.79% undeclared, 10.03% Catholics, 6.75% Orthodox believers, 2.5% atheists, 2.09% Bektashis, 0.07% other Christians and 0.02% other.  The 2011 census on religion and ethnicity has been deemed unreliable by the Council of Europe as well as other internal and external organisations and groups. 

A 2015 study estimated some 13,000 conversions to Christianity from Muslim backgrounds.

Eastern Orthodoxy

According to the numbers given by the government in 2010 it was stated that Eastern Orthodoxy was practiced by about 20% of Albanians within Albania. In the disputed 2011 census the percentage of Orthodox believers was listed as 6.75% of the population. Albania is historically linked with both the Catholic Church and Eastern Orthodoxy. Albanians were among the first peoples of the region to receive missionaries and convert to Christianity. With the split of the Church in 1054, Orthodoxy become the religion for the Albanians inhabiting the areas under the Byzantine rule.

The first Orthodox liturgy in the Albanian language was held not in Albania, but in Pennsylvania and Massachusetts. Subsequently, when the Orthodox Church was not allowed an official existence in communist Albania, Albanian Orthodoxy survived in exile in Philadelphia with the church in Philadelphia being founded in 1913 and in Boston in 1965.

Catholic Church

The Catholic Church in Albania is part of the worldwide Catholic Church, under the spiritual leadership of the Pope in Rome. According to the numbers given by the government in 2011 it was stated that around 10.03% of the religious population is Catholic, however new government figures reveal the percentage of Catholics is 21.3 
There are five dioceses in the country, including two archdioceses plus an Apostolic Administration covering southern Albania.

Prior to the Ottoman invasion, Christianity was the religion of all Albanians. The northern Albanians adhered to Catholicism, whilst in the south they were followers of Eastern Orthodoxy.

Protestantism

There are about 8,000 Protestants in Albania, grouped among 189 Protestant associations including the Albanian Evangelical Alliance (VUSH).

See also

Religion in Albania
Eastern Orthodoxy in Albania
Catholic Church in Albania
Protestantism in Albania

Further reading
Tönnes, Bernhard. "Albania." In The Encyclopedia of Christianity, edited by Erwin Fahlbusch and Geoffrey William Bromiley, 35–36. Vol. 1. Grand Rapids: Wm. B. Eerdmans, 1999.

References

External links